The 1999 Wismilak International was a women's tennis tournament played on outdoor hard courts in Kuala Lumpur, Malaysia that was part of the Tier III category of the 1999 WTA Tour. It was the fifth edition of the tournament and was held from 8 November through 14 November 1999. Unseeded Åsa Carlsson won the singles title and earned $27,000 first-prize money.
Kevin Livensey was the Tournament Director, The Tournament Referee was Fadilah Ghani and the Event Coordinator was Mon S Sudesh and A.Lourdesamy.

Entrants

Seeds

Other entrants
The following players received wildcards into the singles main draw:
  Wynne Prakusya
  Joannette Kruger
  Tina Križan

The following players received wildcards into the doubles main draw:
  Anastasia Myskina /  Sarah Pitkowski

The following players received entry from the singles qualifying draw:

  Annabel Ellwood
  Katalin Marosi
  Jelena Kostanić
  Janet Lee

The following players received entry from the doubles qualifying draw:
  Evelyn Fauth /  Miroslava Vavrinec

Finals

Singles

 Åsa Carlsson defeated  Erika deLone, 6–2, 6–4
 This was Carlsson's first WTA title of her career.

Doubles

 Jelena Kostanić /  Tina Pisnik defeated  Rika Hiraki /  Yuka Yoshida, 3–6, 6–2, 6–4

References

External links
 ITF tournament edition details
 Tournament draws

Wismilak International
Commonwealth Bank Tennis Classic
1999 in Malaysian tennis
Tennis tournaments in Malaysia